Delfines del Este Fútbol Club are a Dominican Republic professional football club which competes in the Liga Dominicana de Fútbol. The club is based in La Romana. The club was established in 2014 after the Dominican Football Federation announced the creation of a professional league, the Liga Dominicana de Fútbol.

Current roster

External links
Delfines del Este FC on FIFA
Delfines del Este FC on LDF

Football clubs in the Dominican Republic
Association football clubs established in 2014
2014 establishments in the Dominican Republic